Rajkumar College (or RKC) in Raipur, Chhattisgarh, is one of the oldest K-12 foundations of India. It was founded by Sir Andrew Fraser in the year 1882 at Jabalpur. The School functioned at Jabalpur till 1892 and thereafter, shifted to its present site at Raipur in 1894, with boarding house facilities. Its estate is spread over 125 acres. It is a co-education, residential cum day boarding public school affiliated to the Council for the Indian School Certificate Examinations, New Delhi and prepares the students for Indian Certificate of Secondary Education (ICSE) (Class X) and Indian School Certificate (ISC) (Class XII) examinations.

History
The school was established in 1882 by the efforts of Sir Andrew Henderson Leith Fraser, KCSI and the British authorities as Rajkumar School at Jabalpur and was closed due poor facilities and location. A decision to shift it to Raipur in 1894 and renamed as Rajkumar College and founded as a Chiefs' College. RKC was created for education of sons and relatives of rulers of Chhattisgarh Feudatory States and local zamindars, who donated funds.

In 1921, it was declared as Chiefs' College. However, in 1939, on joining as a founding member of the Public School Conference, admission was opened to all boys other than from Princely States.

In 1947 the Rajkumar College became the place where the short-lived Eastern States Union was established.

Present day
From 1939 to 1989, RKC was a public boys school with hostel, swimming, playground, hospital, pavilion, library, billiard room, and temple. The medium of education is English with equal emphasis on Hindi.

The institution provides curricular, co-curricular and extra-curricular activities. The campus is 170 acres and has separate sports grounds such as a cricket ground with stadium and several soccer and hockey grounds and individual arena for different sports.

The college has a day school and several boarding house and buildings. The Rajendra Das Boarding House and the Balram Das Boarding House are named after the donors of the State of Nandgaon and they constitute the main building. The Tagore House, named after Rabindranath Tagore, was opened by Jawaharlal Nehru, the first prime minister of India in 1963. The college has a big dining hall, which was inaugurated by Dr. Rajendra Prasad, the first president of India. The campus houses the Koriya Museum after the main donor of the museum building, the princely state of Koriya.

The school is affiliated to Indian School Certificate Examination Board, New Delhi (ICSE) and prepares the students for ICSE (Class X) and ISC (Class XII) Examinations.

Co-educational school
The RKC has become a Co-Educational school from 1996 Onwards.

Management

The school is managed by a board of trustees belonging to original founders, the descendants of feudatory states and zamindars, who have hired professionals for management and day-to-day affairs.

Campus & Infrastructure 
The College puts up with a 125 acres campus in the midst of the city. 

The Auditorium – Jashpur Hall is fully air conditioned and can accommodate more than 1700 persons. Incidentally the first Vidhan Sabha of the newly formed Chhattisgarh State was held in this hall.

Mess & Catering 
The College has a big Dining Hall namely Sarangarh Dining Hall which was inaugurated by Dr. Rajendra Prasad the then President of India where over 600 students can be served meals at a time.

Guest House 
Utkal Bhawan the College Guest House has adequate rooms.

Notable alumni
Raja Digvijai Das
Raja Chakradhar Singh
Kamakhya Narain Singh
Lal Chintamani Sharan Nath Shahdeo
Dharamraj Singh
Pravir Chandra Bhanj Deo
Nareshchandra Singh
Ananga Kumar Patnaik
Sanand Mitra
Hemendra Chandra Singh
Vishwaraj Pratap Singh
Yogeshwar Raj Singh
Vishal Singh
Pratap Keshari Deb

See also
Rajkumar College, Rajkot
Daly College
Mayo College
Scindia School
Beacon English School

References

External links
 

Private schools in Raipur
Boarding schools in Chhattisgarh
Schools in Colonial India
Educational institutions established in 1882
1882 establishments in India
British colonial architecture in India